Derek Fifi "Wise" Bissue (born December 11, 1992), is a Canadian rapper, singer, and songwriter. He was formerly signed to Canadian singer-songwriter the Weeknd's record label, XO and Republic Records, under the hip hop duo 88Glam with his friend, fellow Canadian rapper 88Camino.

Early life
Wise was born in Toronto on December 11, 1992. He grew up listening to American rappers like Juvenile, Trick Daddy, Stack Bundles, Max B, and LL Cool J. By the age of 20, Wise had moved around Toronto 14 times.

Career

2012: Vacay
In October 2012, Wise released Vacay, his debut mixtape with 16 tracks. The mixtape premiered on DatPiff.

2016: Inglorious
After a year of releasing multiple singles and music videos in 2016, Wise announced his debut album Inglorious on January 21, 2017. Inglorious was released on January 30, 2017.

On April 21, 2017, Wise performed at the 2017 Canadian Music Week festival, supporting Bronx artist A Boogie wit da Hoodie.

Wise frequently makes cameo appearances in music videos that feature The Weeknd, most notably in "King of the Fall" and "Reminder".

2017–present: 88Glam

On November 1, 2017, Billboard premiered the music video for "12" from the newly formed duo 88Glam, consisting of Wise and frequent collaborator 88Camino. The music video also featured a cameo appearance by The Weeknd. 88Glam, the self-titled debut project by 88Glam was released on November 7, 2017.

88Glam released 88Glam Reloaded on April 20, 2018, after officially signing to XO and Republic Records. On November 15, 2018, 88Glam released their second album 88Glam2, through XO and Republic.

On March 5, 2020, revealed an upcoming album titled Close to Heaven Far from God which was set to be released on April 17, 2020, through XO and Republic. However, the album has been delayed due to 88Glam's departure from the labels. 88Glam instead released a mixtape independently titled New Mania on June 26, 2020. Close to Heaven Far from God was finally released independently on August 26, 2022, after more than two years of teasing, with major changes from the original tracklist.

Legal issues
On December 11, 2013, Wise was arrested on charges of human trafficking following allegations from a 21-year-old woman. The charges faced by Bissue include trafficking in persons, uttering threats of death and bodily harm, two counts of overcoming resistance by choking, robbery, weapons charges, and three counts of theft under $5,000. Shortly after the charges were dropped, Wise released a track titled "Had to Wake Up" on June 27, 2016, to address the allegations.

Solo discography

Studio albums

Mixtapes

Singles

As lead artist

As featured artist

Music videos

With 88Glam
 88Glam (2017; re-released in 2018)
 88Glam2 (2018)
 New Mania (2020)
 Heaven Can Wait (2021)
 Close to Heaven Far from God (2022)

Awards and nominations

See also
XO

References

Black Canadian musicians
Canadian male rappers
Rappers from Toronto
Living people
XO (record label)
1992 births
21st-century Canadian male musicians
21st-century Canadian rappers